National Secondary Route 153, or just Route 153 (or ) is a National Road Route of Costa Rica, located in the Alajuela province.

Description
In Alajuela province the route covers Alajuela canton (Alajuela, Río Segundo districts).

References

Highways in Costa Rica